Kuytun (Khüiten) is an urban locality (an urban-type settlement) in Kuytunsky District of Irkutsk Oblast, Russia. Population:

References

Urban-type settlements in Irkutsk Oblast